Forever... is a 1975   novel by Judy Blume dealing with teenage sexuality.  Because of the novel's content it has been the frequent target of censorship and appears on the American Library Association list of the 100 Most Frequently Challenged Books of 1990–2000 at number seven.

Plot summary
Katherine, in the middle of her senior year in high school, finds herself strongly attracted to Michael, a boy she meets at a New Year's party. As their relationship unfolds, the issue of sex comes up more as an emotional and health issue than as a moral one. Both of them are aware that physical intimacy is both common and complicated.

Their relationship progresses slowly as they begin to go on dates and trips together; they are accompanied on various meetings by Katherine's friend, Erica, who has known Katherine since the 9th grade and believes that sex is a physical act and not very romantic, and believes Katherine should "just get it out of the way." Erica and Katherine are also joined by Michael's friend Artie, who got together with Erica. 

Katherine and Michael go on a skiing trip, where they plan to have sex, but Katherine has her period, and they are disappointed. Michael teaches Katherine how to hold his penis (nicknamed "Ralph") and how to rub it correctly. When Katherine and Michael do have sex on Michael's sister's living room floor in her apartment, they are sure it seals a love that will be "forever". Michael buys Katherine a necklace for her birthday that says "Katherine" on one side and "Forever...Michael" on the other. That summer, both sets of parents make plans that will take Katherine and Michael to two different states. Katherine finds herself aware of the limitations of the relationship and is ultimately attracted to a tennis instructor, Theo, who is older than Michael. Theo calls her Kat, even though she is at first highly irritated with the nickname. 

Katherine tries to ignore the sexual tension between herself and Theo, but when she is stricken with grief on the death of her grandfather, Theo is the first person she turns to. They kiss, and Theo is the first to pull away ("Not with death for an excuse."). After Katherine is unable to answer Michael's next letters, he shows up at her camp, where his first sight of Katherine is her and Theo hand-in-hand. At a motel room later that night, Katherine is unresponsive, and Michael knows, without her admitting it, that she is involved with someone else. She gives back the necklace, and he drives off in a near-rage. The book ends with one last chance meeting between Michael and Katherine, in which Katherine thinks, and tries to say with her eyes, that she does not regret the relationship, but she's not ready for "forever". At home, Katherine's mother tells her, "Theo called."

Characters 
Major

Katherine Danziger Protagonist of the book.  Katherine turns 18 in the book, and is a senior in high school who is getting ready for college. When she meets Michael, she falls in love with him, and starts a relationship with him. One of the novel's central plotlines is her decision to lose her virginity to him as well as the sexual relationship they share together. After she split off with Michael she started one with Theo.

Michael Wagner The boy who Katherine meets and with whom Katherine falls in love.  He is a senior at another high school nearby. They meet at a New Year's Eve Party, and their relationship develops from there. Michael wanted to make love to Katherine, and after some impatience, agreed to wait until she was ready. He nicknamed his penis "Ralph." They manage to hold a relationship together for a few months before it fell apart.

Erica Small Katherine's best friend, who provides her with emotional support owing to Erica's ability to see situations from a realistic point of view. She sees sex as a physical act, not a romantic one, unlike Katherine, and just wanted her to get over with it.

Artie Lewin A boy who is friends with Katherine and Michael. He is a talented actor who wins a scholarship to a drama academy, and a repressed homosexual who does not respond to Erica's romantic/sexual signals. Over the course of the story, he sinks into depression, which is not helped when his father forbids him to accept the drama scholarship. After a suicide threat, and an attempt, he is committed to a mental hospital. In September, Michael says "He's home; I saw him last week," but no word on his condition. 

Minor

Sybil Davison Katherine's friend (and Erica's cousin) who later gets pregnant when having loveless intercourse because she wanted to have experience in giving birth. She didn't tell her parents because she knew they would have wanted her to have an abortion, and put the baby up for adoption, hoping that they would name her baby girl Jennifer.

Jamie Danziger Katherine's little sister by 5 years. She is proficient in music, art, and cooking. She is in the seventh grade and looks a lot like Katherine. Katherine used to be jealous of Jamie for her artistic ability, but it passed.

Roger Danziger Katherine's father, a pharmacist who owns two drug stores.

Diana Danziger (née Gross) Katherine's mother, a librarian. She gives Katherine sexual advice, and says that losing your virginity is a serious thing.

Hallie Gross Katherine's maternal grandmother, a lawyer and progressive liberal.

Ivan Gross Katherine's maternal grandfather, who had previously had a stroke (he had to walk with a cane and sometimes at a loss for words), and would have another one later in the book that would kill him.

Theo An older boy who Katherine inadvertently falls for while working at a camp, which spells the end of her and Michael.

David A boy Jamie falls in love with, and started a relationship with.

Reception 
On November 5, 2019, the BBC News listed Forever... on its list of the 100 most influential novels.

Awards

Controversy 
Forever... has frequently been banned in schools and libraries  on due to its detailed depictions of sexual intercourse, and because the protagonist,  Katherine, uses birth control. Criticism of the novel often comes from religious groups and pro-abstinence groups who consider the use of 'the pill' unsuitable. The American Library Association's   Office for Intellectual Freedom started tracking the most banned and challenged books in the United States in the 1990s and found that Forever... landed in the top 100 banned and challenged books from 1990-1999 (7th), as well as from 2000-2009 (16th). In 2005, the book was the second most banned and challenged book in the United States.

Adaptations

The book was adapted for American television in 1978, featuring Stephanie Zimbalist as Katherine and Dean Butler as Michael.

In June 2004, the Sacred Fools Theater Company performed a comic adaption of Forever for their Get Lit! series.

In November 2022, Netflix announced that it had commissioned a television series adaptation, with Mara Brock Akil serving as showrunner and executive producer under her overall deal.

See also

 List of most commonly challenged books in the United States

References

External links
Judy Blume's website
Guardian Interview with Judy Blume

1975 American novels
American young adult novels
Novels by Judy Blume
Sexuality in novels
Obscenity controversies in literature
American novels adapted into films
American novels adapted into television shows
Censored books